Nakye Greenidge-Duncan (born April 22, 2003) is a Canadian soccer player who plays as a midfielder for New England Revolution II in MLS Next Pro.

Early life
In 2014, Greenidge-Duncan trialed with Dutch club Feyenoord's academy, after catching the club's attention during a camp run by the club in Toronto. He joined the Toronto FC Academy in 2015. In 2015, he helped the TFC U12 team win the inaugural Generation Adidas Cup, winning MVP honours. The championship qualified the team for the Arousa Futbol 7 tournament, where they faced top European Academy teams, including Barcelona, against whom Greenidge-Duncan scored in a 2-2 draw.

Career
On April 1, 2021, he signed his first professional contract with Toronto FC II of USL League One (they moved to MLS Next Pro in 2022). He made his debut on October 1 against North Carolina FC. He scored his first goal on April 17, 2022 against Chicago Fire FC II. On June 11, 2022, he scored a game-winning goal in stoppage time to give his team a 1-0 victory over Philadelphia Union II. After the 2022 season, Toronto declined his player option for 2023.

In January 2023, he signed with New England Revolution II in MLS Next Pro.

Career statistics

Club

References

2003 births
Living people
Canadian soccer players
Association football midfielders
Toronto FC players
USL League One players
Toronto FC II players
MLS Next Pro players
21st-century Canadian people